Hanussen is a 1988 Hungarian film about Erik Jan Hanussen by István Szabó. It was nominated for the 1988 Academy Award for Best Foreign Language Film. The German language film starred Klaus Maria Brandauer. The film was entered into the 1988 Cannes Film Festival.

Plot
Austrian Klaus Schneider, who later comes to be known as Erik Jan Hanussen is wounded during World War I. While recovering in the care of Dr. Emil Bettelheim (Erland Josephson), the Doctor discovers that Schneider possesses empathic powers. After the war, with one friend as his manager and another as his lover, Schneider changes his name and goes to Berlin to perform in halls and theaters as a hypnotist and mind reader. His purported powers bring him to the attention of the Nazis which cause his fame and power – as well as his own troubles – to grow.

Cast
 Klaus Maria Brandauer – Klaus Schneider / Erik Jan Hanussen
 Erland Josephson – Dr. Bettelheim
 Ildikó Bánsági – Sister Betty
 Walter Schmidinger – Propaganda chief
 Károly Eperjes – Captain Tibor Nowotny
 Grażyna Szapołowska – Valery de la Meer
 Colette Pilz-Warren – Dagma
 Adrianna Biedrzyńska – Wally
 György Cserhalmi – Count Trantow-Waldbach
 Michał Bajor
 Jiří Adamíra
 Róbert Rátonyi
 Kalina Jędrusik (as Kalyna Dygat Jydrusik)
 Gabriela Kownacka
 Ewa Błaszczyk - Henni Stahl

Awards

See also
 List of submissions to the 61st Academy Awards for Best Foreign Language Film
 List of Hungarian submissions for the Academy Award for Best Foreign Language Film

References

External links

1988 films
Hungarian drama films
1980s Hungarian-language films
Austrian drama films
West German films
German drama films
1988 drama films
Films directed by István Szabó
Films set in Berlin
Films set in the 1920s
Films set in the 1930s
Films about magic and magicians
Remakes of German films
1980s German films